Akie may refer to:
Akie people
Akie language
Akie (given name)

Language and nationality disambiguation pages